The Douglas Hickox Award, also named The Douglas Hickox Award (Best Debut Director) is an annual award given by the British Independent Film Awards (BIFA) to recognize the best British debut director. The name of the awards is in honour of British film and television director Douglas Hickox for his commitment and support for new talent. The award was first presented in the 1998 ceremony.

In regards to the category, BIFA states that is "for a British director for their debut fiction feature film. Previous television or documentary credits do not disqualify an individual from consideration. Documentaries are ineligible in this category unless an exception is granted by BIFA’s Nomination Committee".

Winners and nominees

1990s

2000s

2010s

2020s

See also
 BAFTA Award for Outstanding Debut by a British Writer, Director or Producer

References

External links
 Official website

British Independent Film Awards